Omrane Ayari (born 12 April 1972) is a Tunisian wrestler. He competed at the 1996 Summer Olympics and the 2000 Summer Olympics.

References

1972 births
Living people
Tunisian male sport wrestlers
Olympic wrestlers of Tunisia
Wrestlers at the 1996 Summer Olympics
Wrestlers at the 2000 Summer Olympics
Place of birth missing (living people)
20th-century Tunisian people